The De Long Mountains are a mountain range in the North Slope Borough of the U.S. state of Alaska. The range is located at the west end of the Brooks Range and extends west from Uivaksak Creek and the head of the Kuna River.  They were named in 1886 after the Arctic explorer George Washington De Long (1844–1881).

References

Brooks Range
Mountains of North Slope Borough, Alaska